Peteryoungia aggregata is a gram-negative bacterium of the genus Peteryoungia.

References

Rhizobiaceae